Grant Township is one of sixteen townships in Franklin County, Iowa, United States.  As of the 2010 census, its population was 331 and it contained 154 housing units.

History
Grant Township was created in 1870.

Geography

Cities, towns, villages
 Bradford

Cemeteries
The township contains Pleasant Hill Cemetery and Saint Peters Evangelical Cemetery.

Transportation
 Iowa Highway 57
 U.S. Route 20
 U.S. Route 65

School districts
 Agwsr Community School District
 Hampton-Dumont Community School District
 Iowa Falls Community School District

Political districts
 Iowa's 4th congressional district
 State House District 54
 State Senate District 27

References

External links
 City-Data.com

Townships in Iowa
Townships in Franklin County, Iowa
Populated places established in 1870
1870 establishments in Iowa